{{Infobox nobility title
|name=Earldom of Northumberlandsubsidiary title of theDuke of Northumberland
|image=
|image_size=
|alt=
|caption=Arms of Ralph Percy, 12th Duke of Northumberland and 13th Earl of Northumberland (fifth creation)
|creation_date=1377 (first creation)1416 (second creation)1464 (third creation)1674 (fourth creation) 1749 (fifth creation)
|creation=
|monarch=Richard II (first creation) Henry V (second creation) Henry VI (third creation) Edward VI (second creation restored)Charles II (fourth creation)George II (fifth creation)|peerage=Peerage of England (first to fourth creations)Peerage of Great Britain (fifth creation)
|baronetage=
|first_holder=Henry Percy
|last_holder=
|present_holder=Ralph Percy, 12th Duke of Northumberland
|heir_apparent=George Percy, Earl Percy
|heir_presumptive=
|remainder_to=
|subsidiary_titles=
|status=Fifth creation extant
|extinction_date=1405 (first creation) 1461(second creation forfeit) 1471 (third creation)1670 (second creation extinct)1683 (fourth creation)
|family_seat=Alnwick CastleSyon House
|former_seat=
|motto=
|footnotes=
}}

The title of Earl of Northumberland has been created several times in the Peerage of England and of Great Britain, succeeding the title Earl of Northumbria. Its most famous holders are the House of Percy (alias Perci), who were the most powerful noble family in Northern England for much of the Middle Ages. The heirs of the Percys, via a female line, were ultimately made Duke of Northumberland in 1766, and continue to hold the earldom as a subsidiary title.

History
Percy family

 
William de Percy, 1st Baron Percy, was in the train of William I. After arriving in England following the Harrying of the North (1069–70), he was bestowed modest estates in Yorkshire by Hugh d'Avranches. However, by the reign of Henry II the family was represented by only an heiress, Agnes de Percy (died 1203) following the death of the third feudal baron. As her dowry contained the manor of Topcliffe in Yorkshire, Adeliza of Louvain, the widowed and remarried second wife of Henry I, arranged the marriage of Agnes with her own young half-brother, Joscelin of Louvain. After their wedding, the nobleman from the Duchy of Brabant in the Holy Roman Empire settled in England. He adopted the surname Percy and his descendants were later created Earls of Northumberland. The Percys' line would go on to play a large role in the history of both England and Scotland. As nearly every Percy was a Warden of the Marches, Scottish affairs were often of more concern than those in England.

1309:  1st Baron Percy
In 1309, Henry de Percy, 1st Baron Percy purchased Alnwick Castle from Antony Bek, Bishop of Durham. The castle had been founded in the late 11th century by Ivo de Vesci, a  nobleman from Vassy or Vichy.  A descendant of Ivo de Vesci, John de Vesci, succeeded to his father's titles and estates upon his father's death in Gascony in 1253. These included the barony of Alnwick and a large property in Northumberland and considerable estates in Yorkshire, including Malton. Due to being under age, King Henry III of England conferred the wardship of John's estates to a foreign kinsman, which caused great offence to the de Vesci family. The family's property and estates had been put into the guardianship of Bek, who sold them to the Percys. From this time, the fortunes of the Percys, although they still held their Yorkshire lands and titles, were linked permanently with Alnwick and its castle.

1316:  2nd Baron Percy
Henry de Percy, 2nd Baron Percy, who was granted the lands of Patrick IV, Earl of March, in Northumberland, by Edward II in 1316, began to improve the size and defences of the castle. He was appointed to Edward III's Council in 1327 and was given the manor and castle of Skipton. Was granted, by Edward III, the castle and barony of Warkworth in 1328. He was at the siege of Dunbar and the Battle of Halidon Hill and was subsequently appointed constable of Berwick-upon-Tweed. In 1346, Henry commanded the right wing of the English Army which defeated a larger Scottish force at the Battle of Neville's Cross. His son, Henry de Percy, 3rd Baron Percy married Mary of Lancaster, an aunt of John of Gaunt's wife Blanche of Lancaster.

1377 creation

 
In 1377, the next Henry Percy was created Earl of Northumberland, which title he was given after the coronation of Richard II. Nor was this all, for he was that Northumberland whose doings in the next reign fill so large a part of Shakespeare's Henry IV, and he was the father of the most famous Percy of all, Henry Percy the fifth, better known as "Hotspur". Hotspur never became Earl of Northumberland, having been slain at Shrewsbury in the lifetime of his father, whose estates were forfeited under attainder on account of the rebellion of himself and his son against King Henry IV.

1416 creation
Henry V restored Hotspur's son, the second Earl, to his family honours, and the Percys were staunch Lancastrians during the Wars of the Roses which followed, the third Earl and three of his brothers losing their lives in the cause.

The fourth Earl was involved in the political manoeuvrings of the last Yorkist kings Edward IV and Richard III. Through either indecision or treachery he did not respond in a timely manner at the Battle of Bosworth Field, and thus helped cause his ally Richard III's defeat at the hands of Henry Tudor (who became Henry VII). In 1489, he was pulled from his horse and murdered by some of his tenants.

The fifth Earl displayed magnificence in his tastes, and being one of the richest magnates of his day, kept a very large household establishment.

Henry Percy, the sixth Earl of Northumberland, loved Anne Boleyn, and was her accepted suitor before Henry VIII married her. He married later to Mary Talbot, the daughter of the Earl of Shrewsbury, but as he died without a son, his nephew Thomas Percy became the seventh Earl.

Thereafter, a succession of plots and counterplots—the Rising of the North, the plots to liberate Mary Queen of Scots, and the Gunpowder Plot – each claimed a Percy among their adherents. On this account the eighth and ninth Earls spent many years in the Tower, but the tenth Earl, Algernon, fought against King Charles in the Civil War, the male line of the Percy-Louvain house ending with Josceline, the eleventh Earl. The heiress to the vast Percy estates married the Duke of Somerset; and her granddaughter married a Yorkshire knight, Sir Hugh Smithson, who in 1766 was created the first Duke of Northumberland and Earl Percy, and it is their descendants who now represent the famous old house.

The current duke lives at Alnwick Castle and Syon House, just outside London.

List of titleholders

Early earls

Earls of Northumberland, first creation (1377)
Henry Percy, 1st Earl of Northumberland (1341–1408) (attainted 1405)
Sir Henry Percy, also called Harry Hotspur KG (c. 1365–1403) heir apparentEarls of Northumberland, second creation (1416)
Henry Percy, 2nd Earl of Northumberland (1394–1455), grandson of Henry (1341–1408) and son of "Hotspur"
Henry Percy, 3rd Earl of Northumberland (1421–1461), (forfeit 1461), son of Henry 2nd Earl

Earl of Northumberland, third creation (1464)
John Neville, Earl of Northumberland, (1st Marquess of Montagu) (1431–1471), (1464–1470 released)

Earls of Northumberland (1416, cont.)
Henry Percy, 4th Earl of Northumberland (1449–1489) (restored 1470–1473), son of Henry 3rd
Henry Algernon Percy, 5th Earl of Northumberland (1478–1527), son of Henry 4th
Henry Percy, 6th Earl of Northumberland (1502–1537), son of Henry 5th, died without children
Thomas Percy, 7th Earl of Northumberland (1528–1572) (father attainted, restored 1557), grandson of Henry 5th
Henry Percy, 8th Earl of Northumberland (1532–1585), also grandson of Henry 5th, younger brother of Thomas
Henry Percy, 9th Earl of Northumberland (1564–1632), son of Henry 8th
Algernon Percy, 10th Earl of Northumberland (1602–1668), son of Henry 9th
Josceline Percy, 11th Earl of Northumberland (1644–1670), son of Algernon, died leaving only one daughter, so the Earldom became extinct

Various references use at least three different sequences of numbers for the Earls; the ones shown here are those used in the individual articles on the 12 Earls. The major difference arises from the question of whether Henry (1394–1455) was 1st as a new creation or 2nd as a restoration of the rights of his grandfather, Henry (1341–1408). Additionally, there is some debate about whether the 7th Earl was restored to the previous creation or was given a new creation.

Earls of Northumberland, fourth creation (1674)
George FitzRoy, Earl of Northumberland (1665–1716) (became Duke of Northumberland in 1683; extinct)

Earls of Northumberland, fifth creation (1749)
Algernon Seymour, 7th Duke of Somerset (1684–1750), female-line grandson and heir of the 11th Earl of the 1416 creation
Elizabeth Percy née Seymour (1716–1776), only daughter of the 1st Earl, married Sir Hugh Smithson
Hugh Percy, 2nd Earl of Northumberland (1714–1786), changed his name to Percy when he inherited the Earldom of Northumberland from his father-in-law by special remainder; became Duke of Northumberland in 1766
The line continues with the Dukes of Northumberland (third creation)

Family tree

See also
List of monarchs of Northumbria
Earl of York
Baron Percy

References

Bibliography
Non-Fiction
 
Rose, Alexander. Kings in the North: The House of Percy in British History. Phoenix/Orion Books Ltd, 2002. , .
Tate, George, The history of the borough, castle, and barony of Alnwick. Henry Hunter Hare, Alnwick, 1866

The Earls of Northumberland in Literature and Media
The 1st Earl of Norhumberland and his son, Henry "Hotspur" Percy, play large roles in Shakespeare's play, "Henry IV, Part 1).
A Bloody Field by Shrewsbury by Edith Pargeter (1st Earl of Northumberland and Henry "Hotspur" Percy)
Lion of Alnwick (Book 1 of The Percy Saga) by Carol Wensby-Scott (1st Earl of Northumberland and Henry "Hotspur" Percy)
Lion Dormant (Book 2 of The Percy Saga) by Carol Wensby-Scott (Hotspur's son the 2nd Earl of Northumberland and his son the 3rd Earl of Northumberland)
Lion Invincible (Book 3 of The Percy Saga) by Carol Wensby-Scott (The 4th Earl of Northumberland)
Alnwick Castle, the traditional home of the Earls of Northumberland, was used as the location of Hogwarts in the Harry Potter movies.

Notes
This article incorporates text from a publication now in the public domain in the US: Northumberland Yesterday and To-day'' by Jean F. Terry, 1913

Extinct earldoms in the Peerage of England
History of Northumberland
Earldoms in the Peerage of Great Britain
Noble titles created in 1377
Noble titles created in 1416
Noble titles created in 1464
Noble titles created in 1674
Noble titles created in 1749
 
Peerages created with special remainders